The 2021 America East Men's Basketball Conference tournament was the postseason men's basketball tournament for the America East Conference that began February 27, 2021 and ended March 13, 2021. Starting in the semifinals, all tournament games were played on the home arenas of the higher-seeded school. In Pod Play and the Quarterfinals, games were played at either New Hampshire or Hartford. The winner received the conference's automatic bid to the NCAA tournament.

Seeds
All of the teams, except for Maine, in the conference standings qualified for the tournament. Maine cancelled their season after going 2–7, so they did not compete in the conference tournament. The teams were seeded by record in conference, with a tiebreaker system to seed teams with identical conference records.

Schedule

Bracket and results

Game summaries

Pod Play

See also
 2021 America East women's basketball tournament
 America East Conference men's basketball tournament

References

Tournament
America East Conference men's basketball tournament
America East men's basketball tournament